Dom Salvador, (born 1938 in Rio Claro) stage name of Salvador da Silva Filho, is a Brazilian jazz/MPB pianist most notable for his Rio 65 Trio that featured the Brazilian jazz drummer Edison Machado and bassist Sergio Barrozo. He also did tours of Europe with musicians like Sylvia Telles. In May 1976, he recorded his one and only American jazz album, My Family, for Muse Records in New York City. Over his long career, he has performed with musicians like Rubens Bassini, Jorge Ben, Elza Soares and Elis Regina, to name a few. In later life he formed the a trio

He currently holds residency in Brooklyn, New York, at the River Cafe, and has done so since 1977.

Discography

As leader
 Salvador Trio (Mocambo, 1965)
 Rio 65 Trio (Philips, 1965)
 Som, Sangue e Raca (CBS, 1971)
 My Family (Muse, 1976)
 Dom Salvador Trio (Imagem, 1995)
 Tristeza (Whatmusic.com, 2002)
 Transition with Duduka da Fonseca, Rogerio Botter Maio (Lua, 2003)
 The Art of Samba Jazz (Salmarsi, 2010)

As sideman
With Victor Assis Brasil
 Toca Antonio Carlos Jobim (Quartin, 1970)
 Esperanto (Tapecar, 1976)

With Robin Kenyatta
 Nomusa (Muse, 1975)
 Take the Heat Off Me (Jazz Dance, 1979)

With Herbie Mann
 Sunbelt (Atlantic, 1978)
 Mellow (Atlantic, 1981)

With Lloyd McNeill
 Treasures (Baobab, 1976)
 Tori (Baobab, 1978)
 Elegia (Baobab, 1980)

With Dom Um Romao
 Dom Um Romao (Muse, 1974)
 Spirit of the Times (Muse, 1975)
 Hotmosphere (Pablo, 1976)

With others
 Harry Belafonte, Turn the World Around (CBS, 1977)
 Luiz Bonfa, Manhattan Strut (Paddle Wheel, 1997)
 Elizeth Cardoso, Falou e Disse (Copacabana, 1970)
 Paul Horn, Altura Do Sol (Epic, 1976)
 Azar Lawrence, Summer Solstice (Prestige, 1975)
 Edu Lobo, Edu Lobo (Trova, 1973)
 Tim Maia, Tim Maia (Polydor, 1972)
 Ugo Marotta, Baiao Rides Again (Tapecar, 1973)
 Wilson das Neves, Samba Tropi (Elenco, 1970)
 Ivo Perelman, Man of the Forest (GM, 1994)
 Charlie Rouse, Cinnamon Flower (Douglas, 1977)
 Marcos Valle, Garra (Light in the Attic, 2012)
 Martinho da Vila, Batuque Na Cozinha (RCA Victor, 1972)

References

External links
Dom Salvador's website

1938 births
Living people
Brazilian jazz pianists
Música Popular Brasileira pianists
Muse Records artists
Musicians from São Paulo
21st-century pianists